Sayerwood South or Sayrewood South is an unincorporated community located within Old Bridge Township in Middlesex County, New Jersey, United States.

References

Old Bridge Township, New Jersey
Unincorporated communities in Middlesex County, New Jersey
Unincorporated communities in New Jersey